Maximira Figueiredo (2 February 1939 – 15 October 2018) was a Brazilian actress. She was known for having voiced the character Rosie in the Brazilian dubbing version of The Jetsons cartoon.

Filmography

Film

Television

References

External links 

1939 births
2018 deaths
Actresses from São Paulo
Brazilian film actresses
Brazilian telenovela actresses
Brazilian voice actresses
Deaths from lung cancer in Brazil
20th-century Brazilian actresses
21st-century Brazilian actresses